Juan Ignacio Dobboletta (born 6 January 1993) is an Argentine professional footballer who plays as a goalkeeper for San Marcos de Arica.

Career
Dobboletta started out in the youth ranks of Racing Club. Defensa y Justicia signed Dobboletta on 30 June 2014. He remained for the 2014 and 2015 seasons in the Primera División, but didn't make an appearance for the club; though was on the substitutes bench six times. In January 2016, Dobboletta completed a move to Juventud Unida Universitario. Like with his former team, the goalkeeper didn't play for the San Luis outfit; only appearing as a sub once, versus Atlético Paraná on 12 June. Later that month, on 30 June, Dobboletta joined Defensores de Belgrano. Twenty-seven total appearances followed.

On 2 August 2017, Dobboletta swapped Torneo Federal A for fellow third tier league Primera B Metropolitana by agreeing a loan deal with Acassuso. He participated thirty-five times in 2017–18, including for his debut against Barracas Central on 2 September, as they were eliminated from the promotion play-offs by UAI Urquiza. June 2018 saw Dobboletta join Villa Dálmine of Primera B Nacional.

Career statistics
.

References

External links

1993 births
Living people
People from San Lorenzo Department
Argentine footballers
Argentine expatriate footballers
Association football goalkeepers
Torneo Federal A players
Primera B Metropolitana players
Primera Nacional players
Segunda División Profesional de Chile players
Defensa y Justicia footballers
Juventud Unida Universitario players
Defensores de Belgrano de Villa Ramallo players
Club Atlético Acassuso footballers
Villa Dálmine footballers
San Marcos de Arica footballers
Expatriate footballers in Chile
Argentine expatriate sportspeople in Chile
Sportspeople from Santa Fe Province